Jalgaon is a city in Maharashtra, India. The city is located in North Maharashtra, and serves as the administrative headquarters of its namesake district, the Jalgaon district. The Girna river flows from the western part of the city. Jalgaon is colloquially known as the “Banana City of India" as the region's (Jalgaon district) farmers grow approximately two-thirds of Maharashtra's banana production.

According to Abul Fazal (Gladwin's AineAkbari 1157), the name Khandesh is derived from the "Khan" title given by Ahmad-I of Gujarat (1411-1443) to Malik Nasir, the second of the Faruki kings. According to some sources, the name comes from the Khandava forest of Mahabharat. The Mahabharat mentions Yuvanshava, the ruler of Toranmal (Nandurbar district) as fighting with the Pandavas. The rock temples and caves at Nashik and Ajanta show that during the first three centuries AD, Khandesh was under the rulers who patronized Buddhism. Thereafter, it was ruled by Saptavananas, Andhrabhrityas, Virsen (Ahir King), Yawan dynasty, Chalukyas, Yadavs and then Alaud-din Khilji, Mohammad Tughlak, Malik Raja Malik Nazir, the Nizam of Hyderabad, and subsequently the Marathas ruled the region.

The former Khandesh which was controlled by the Faruqui dynasty of Burhanpur, was than well established by the Maratha Royal named Tulajirao Bhoite and became Jalgaon. The Bhoite rulers built a mansion there which is now recognized as Bhoite Gadhi. In the 18th century, Khandesh was captured by British troops from the Holkar regime with Dhule as the headquarters. Robert Gill was the first officer of British East India Company in the Khandesh District with headquarters in Dhule.In 1906 Khandesh was divided between East Khandesh and West Khandesh, and Jalgaon became the headquarters of East Khandesh district. After the 1956 reorganisation of India's states, East Khandesh became part of Bombay State and later in 1960 it became part of Maharashtra.

Transport 
Jalgaon's airport was built in 1973 by the Public Works Department. The Jalgaon municipal council took over its operations in April 1997 and handed it over to the Maharashtra Airport Development Company in April 2007. The Government of Maharashtra signed a Memorandum of Understanding (MoU) with The Airports Authority of India (AAI) to upgrade the existing airfield in July 2009. Pratibha Patil, then president of India, laid the foundation stone for the development and expansion of the Jalgaon airport in June 2010. Jalgaon offers flights to Mumbai, Hyderabad, Ahmedabad, Kolhapur, Nashik and Nanded operated by Trujet airlines.

The city is served by the Jalgaon Junction railway station. The railway connects the city to major cities like New Delhi, Mumbai, Hyderabad, Kolkata, Jaipur, Chennai, Agra, and Lucknow.

Education

North Maharashtra University is located 8 km away from the city center. Prominent under/post-graduate colleges in the city are Mooljee Jetha College and Nutan Maratha College.

Jalgaon has two medical colleges, Government Medical College and Dr. Ulhas Patil Medical College and Hospital, Jalgaon.

Climate
Jalgaon has a hot semi-arid climate (Köppen BSh) owing to the rain shadow of the Western Ghats. There are three seasons in Jalgaon: the sweltering and arid "hot" season from March to mid-June, the hot and steamy "wet" under the monsoon from mid-June to September, and the hot and dry "cool" season from October to February. In Jalgaon District, the average annual rainfall is around 690 mm and the temperature can range from 10 to 48 degrees Celsius, making it a diverse climate with scorching summers of up to 45 degrees Celsius.

Tourist attractions
Gandhi Teerth is one of the biggest tourist attractions in Jalgaon City. It is a research institution and museum based on the life of Mahatma Gandhi. It was established on 25 March 2012 by the Gandhi Research Foundation.

Guru Purnima festival at Maharishi Krishna Dvaipayana Vedvysa Temple in Yawal is also a popular pilgrimage destination. It is visited by pilgrims from within Jalgaon and neighboring states like Madhya Pradesh. The temple is located at the confluence of the river Hadkhai-Khadkai also known previously as River Harita and Sarita. Vyasa was invited by the sage Lomasha to perform a sacrifice for the Pandavas after their incognito exile. It is one of the main three temples of Vyasa, the others being Vyas Chatti, Badrinath and Vyas Kashi Temple.

Other ancient pilgrim places and tourist destination include,

 Changdeva Temple 
 Patnadevi, an old temple built by the Mandlik kings of Yadav completed in year 1128 AD. 
 Mudhai Devi Temple, of Hemadpanti architecture built around 1150–1200 AD 
 Saint Muktabai Temple, home to Muktabai Dindi, which has been an integral part of the Pandharpur Wari for over 310 years.
 Satpuda Manudevi Temple, Adgaon
 Unapdev Hot Water Fountain was mentioned in the Ramayana epic and has a touch of Lord Rama during his fourteen-year exile from Ayodhya
 Padmalaya – Ganpati Temple (Prabhakshetra), is one of the Saade-teen (three and a half) 'Shree Ganapati Peeth' in India. It has two swayambhu idols consist of corals and one has its trunk curving to the right and other one to the left.

Demographics
As per Indian government census 2011, the population was 4,60,228 out of this 240590 were males and 219638 were females.

Notable people
 Bhāskara II (c. 1114–1185), aka Bhāskarāchārya, was an Indian mathematician and astronomer 
 Bahinabai Chaudhari (1880–1951), a farmer whose poetry, published posthumously, helped popularize the Ahirani dialect.
 Pandurang Sadashiv Sane, aka Sane Guruji, social activist and freedom fighter worked as the teacher in Pratap High School in Amalner town.
 Balkavi (1890–1918), a Marathi poet.
 Keki Moos (1912-1989), a famous artist and painter
 Suresh Jain, 8 times MLA from city and Ex-minister of Govt of Maharashtra.
 Ishwarlal Jain (1946 – present), three times MLA and 6 years Rajya Sabha MP. NCP Party Treasurer.
 Bhavarlal Jain (1937–2016), an entrepreneur who founded Jain Irrigation Systems.
 Haribhau Jawale (1953 – present), 3 term MLA and Member of Parliament from Raver.
 Eknath Khadse (1952–present), a politician of the Nationalist Congress Party.
 Namdeo Dhondo Mahanor (1942–present), a Marathi poet and recipient of the Padma Shri award.
 Ujjwal Nikam, a public prosecutor who has worked on high-profile murder and terrorism cases.
 Gulab Raghunath Patil (1966–present) Senior Leader of Shiv Sena and Minister in Maharashtra.
 Pratibha Patil (1934–present), a former president of India (2007–12) and governor of Rajasthan (2004–07).

See also
 Jain Irrigation Systems
 Jalgaon Municipal Corporation
 Jalgaon Zilla Parishad
 Make in Maharashtra

References

External links
 

 
All articles containing potentially dated statements
Articles containing potentially dated statements from 2001
Talukas in Maharashtra
Cities in Maharashtra